Philip Widmer (born October 18, 1983) is a Canadian cross-country skier.

Born in Banff, Alberta, Widmer made his World Cup debut in 2005. His best finish to date came in January 2009, when he teamed with Brent McMurtry to finish 9th in the team sprint in Vancouver. His best individual performances came in 2008, when he placed 13th in the sprint event at Canmore.

Widmer competed in one event at the 2006 Olympics in Turin. He finished 47th in the qualifying portion of the  sprint, failing to advance to the quarterfinals.

References

External links
FIS profile
Official site

1983 births
Living people
Olympic cross-country skiers of Canada
Cross-country skiers at the 2006 Winter Olympics
People from Banff, Alberta
Canadian male cross-country skiers